Karl Widmark (June 16, 1911 – October 14, 1995) was a Swedish sprint canoeist competing for Västerås canoeing club in the late 1930s. He won two gold medals at the 1938 ICF Canoe Sprint World Championships in Vaxholm, earning them in the K-1 1000 m and K-1 10000 m events.

References

Västerås Kanotförening
 

Swedish male canoeists
1911 births
1995 deaths
ICF Canoe Sprint World Championships medalists in kayak